Ward Wood (August 8, 1924 – November 3, 2001), was an American actor and television writer. Wood was probably best known for his recurring role as police Lt. Art Malcolm in the TV series Mannix from 1968 to 1975.

Wood was born in Grangeville, Idaho (where his grandfather had been the county sheriff from 1891 until 1893).  He was introduced to acting at an early age in Lewiston, Idaho by his mother and their family moved to California about 1935.  He broke into movie acting in 1943, but very quickly took a hiatus to enlist as a Marine in World War II to avenge the death of his brother Charles, who was also an actor and also a Marine, after Charles was killed in action in the Pacific. After the war, Ward Wood returned to acting in 1947, and was active until the early 1980s. He was married to Peggy Jolene Mosley and Lynn Sherman.

Filmography

Film

Television

References

External links
 
 Ward Wood at Turner Classic Movies

1924 births
2001 deaths
American male film actors
American male television actors
Male actors from Los Angeles
American television writers
20th-century American male actors
American male screenwriters
American male television writers
United States Marines
United States Marine Corps personnel of World War II
Screenwriters from California
20th-century American male writers
20th-century American screenwriters